Mike Hines may refer to:

 Mike Hines (baseball) (1862–1910), Major League Baseball catcher
 Mike Hines (snooker player) (born 1945), South African snooker player

See also
 Michael Hines, television and film director